A special election was held on September 10, 2019, to fill the vacancy in North Carolina's 9th congressional district in the United States House of Representatives for the remainder of the 116th United States Congress. The seat had been vacant since the opening of the 116th Congress, following the refusal of the North Carolina State Board of Elections to certify the results of the November 2018 election in the district due to allegations of electoral fraud. Because of the allegations, the race received substantial national attention.

In the original election, Mark Harris, a Republican, led Democrat Dan McCready by 905 votes in the unofficial returns for the 2018 North Carolina's 9th congressional district election. However, allegations of fraud in the election prevented its certification. After hearing evidence, including testimony from Harris himself and his own son, the board unanimously voted on February 21 to call a new election.

The primary was held on May 14, 2019 and the general election was held on September 10. A total of 10 Republican candidates qualified for the primary. Dan McCready, the Democratic Party nominee in the 2018 election, ran again and faced no primary opposition. Among Republicans, neither Harris nor Robert Pittenger, the incumbent whom Harris defeated in the 2018 primary election, filed to run.

After winning the Republican primary by a large margin, Dan Bishop narrowly won the general election, garnering 50.7% of the vote to McCready's 48.7%.

Background

The 2018 congressional district election ended with Republican Mark Harris leading Democrat Dan McCready by 905 votes, the closest race in the district in over sixty years. While McCready had conceded defeat, the North Carolina Democratic Party alleged that electoral fraud had taken place, and filed affidavits with the North Carolina State Board of Elections alleging that independent contractors working on behalf of Harris had illegally collected absentee ballots (ballot harvesting). The North Carolina Board of Elections voted unanimously not to certify the election and later ordered an evidentiary hearing to be held. The board also opened an investigation around the activities of Leslie McCrae Dowless, a campaign operative with felony fraud and perjury convictions, who was hired by the Harris campaign. Incoming Democratic Majority Leader Steny Hoyer announced that the United States House of Representatives would not seat Harris until the fraud investigation had been completed.

After a delay caused by restructuring of the Board of Elections and delayed appointment of members by Republican allies of Harris, the board set hearings to begin on February 18, 2019. On that day the regulator reported that it had found evidence of "a coordinated, unlawful and substantially resourced absentee ballot scheme" that may have involved more than 1,000 ballots or ballot request forms. On February 20, Harris's son, John Harris, a federal prosecutor in North Carolina, testified to the election board that he had repeatedly warned his father not to hire Dowless because Dowless appeared to have previously engaged in illegal tactics to win votes.

On February 21, Harris announced that "the public's confidence in the ninth district seat general election has been undermined to an extent that a new election is warranted." The Board of Elections voted unanimously to call a special election, with a primary if necessary on May 14, to fill the vacancy. This was the first House of Representatives election to require a do-over since 1974.

Leslie McCrae Dowless was indicted and arrested on February 27, 2019. He faced felony charges of obstruction of justice, conspiracy to commit obstruction of justice and two possession of absentee ballots charges. In July 2019, the Wake County district attorney also announced charges against Lisa Britt, Ginger S. Eason, Woody D. Hester, James Singletary, Jessica Dowless and Kelly Hendrix, and additional charges against Leslie McCrae Dowless.

Republican primary

Candidates

Nominee
Dan Bishop, attorney and state senator

Defeated in primary
Chris Anglin, attorney and candidate for North Carolina Supreme Court in 2018
Leigh Brown, realtor, CEO and author 
Kathie Day, realtor
Gary Dunn, perennial candidate
Matthew Ridenhour, former Mecklenburg County commissioner
Stevie Rivenbark, businesswoman
Stony Rushing, Union County commissioner
Fern Shubert, former state senator and candidate for governor in 2004
Albert Lee Wiley Jr., perennial candidate

Withdrew
David Blackwelder, Wake Forest police officer and nominee for Wake County Board of Commissioners District 6 in 2018

Declined
Dean Arp, state representative (endorsed Dan Bishop)
Dan Barry, chair of the Union County Republican Party and candidate for North Carolina's 9th congressional district in 2012 (endorsed Dan Bishop)
William M. Brawley, former state representative (endorsed Dan Bishop)
Danny Britt, state senator (endorsed Dan Bishop)
Andy Dulin, former state representative
Mark Harris, pastor, nominee for North Carolina's 9th congressional district in 2018, candidate for North Carolina's 9th congressional district in 2016, and candidate for U.S. Senate in 2014 (endorsed Stony Rushing)
Nat Robertson, former mayor of Fayetteville, North Carolina
Pat McCrory, former Governor of North Carolina
Robert Pittenger, former U.S. Representative (endorsed Matthew Ridenhour)
Kenny Smith, former Charlotte city councilman and nominee for mayor of Charlotte in 2017 (endorsed Dan Bishop)
Scott Stone, former state representative
Tommy Tucker, former state senator (endorsed Dan Bishop)

Endorsements

Polling

Results

Democratic primary

Candidates

Declared 
Dan McCready, former U.S. Marine, businessman, and nominee for North Carolina's 9th congressional district in 2018

Endorsements

Libertarian primary

Candidates

Declared 
Jeff Scott, nominee for North Carolina's 9th congressional district in 2018

Green primary

Candidates

Declared 
Allen Smith, perennial candidate

General election
Dan McCready, the Democratic candidate, ran on a platform of cutting taxes on the middle class, ending gerrymandering, renegotiating trade deals, and reducing military interventions overseas. His platform also supports protecting Social Security and Medicare, overturning Citizens United, and granting full federal recognition to the Lumbee Tribe. Republican candidate Dan Bishop is best known for his opposition to LGBT rights, particularly the drafting of North Carolina's "Bathroom Bill".

During the early voting period for this election, Hurricane Dorian battered the eastern coast of the United States, necessitating early voting to be halted in several counties on the Outer Banks and elsewhere on the coast until the storm had passed.

Predictions

Endorsements

Polling

with Mark Harris

with generic Republican and Dan McCready

with generic Republican and generic Democrat

Fundraising

Results

County results

Notes
Partisan clients

Additional candidates

References

External links
Official campaign websites
 Dan Bishop (R) for Congress
 Dan McCready (D) for Congress 
 Jeff Scott (L) for Congress
 Allen Smith (G) for Congress 

North Carolina 09
2019 09
North Carolina 09
United States House of Representatives 09
United States House of Representatives 2019 09
North Carolina 2019 09
September 2019 events in the United States